Troyanovo is a village in the Kameno municipality, of Burgas, in southeast Bulgaria.

References

Villages in Burgas Province